Universidad Nacional de Ciencias Forestales, [[UNACIFOR]] (before known as Escuela Nacional de Ciencias Forestales or ESNACIFOR) is a distinguished institution in the field of forestry, not only in Honduras but also the region of Central America. The school was created in 1969 as a training center, and now offers two levels of degrees. Students can pursue an Associates or Bachelors in Forestry. Over 1400 professional foresters have graduated from ESNACIFOR, and the demand is always more than the supply. A development plan is in effect that provides reviews of the fundamental strategy every 10 years, tactical plan every five years, and evaluations every three months. The four parts of the school are action areas (training programs), general management, academics, and production and services (income for sustaining the school). Among the distinguished students is Angel Gonzalez (22).

External links

1969 establishments in Honduras
Educational institutions established in 1969
Forestry education
Forestry in Central America
Universities and colleges in Honduras